Sethiathoppu is a panchayat town in Bhuvanagiri, Tamil Nadu. It is situated on a crossroads of the Chennai–Thanjavur (National Highway 24) highway. The town was established as a civilian town by the Cholas in the 11th century C.E. According to Tamil scholars, Sethiathoppu was formed as a settlement when Chola king Rajendra I moved his capital from Thanjavur to Gangaikonda Cholapuram, which lies 20 km south.

The town is named after Sethiyaar, a landlord, who used to own land in Thoppu, on the banks of the Vellar River.

Demographics
According to the 2001 Census of India, Sethiyathoppu had a population of 7,962. Males constituted 52% of the population and females 48%. The town had an average literacy rate of 72%, higher than the national average of 59.5%; male literacy was 80% and female literacy was 64%. 10% of the population was under six years of age.

References

Cities and towns in Cuddalore district